"The Musical Box" is a song by English progressive rock band Genesis, which was originally released on their third studio album Nursery Cryme in 1971. The song is written in the key of F# major. This song is the longest song on the album at ten and a half minutes.

Composition 
Though credited solely to Banks/Collins/Gabriel/Hackett/Rutherford, "The Musical Box" began as an instrumental piece written by Mike Rutherford and Anthony Phillips called "F#" (later released as "Manipulation" on the Box Set remaster). The lyrics are based on a Victorian fairy tale written by Gabriel, about two children in a country house. The girl, Cynthia, kills the boy, Henry, by cleaving his head off with a croquet mallet. She later discovers Henry's musical box. When she opens it, "Old King Cole" plays, and Henry returns as a spirit, but starts aging very quickly. This causes him to experience a lifetime's sexual desire in a few moments, and he tries to persuade Cynthia to have sexual intercourse with him. However, the noise causes his nurse to arrive, and she throws the musical box at him, destroying them both. The album cover shows Cynthia holding a croquet mallet, with a few heads lying on the ground.

Collins unusually uses mallets on his drums during the flute solo and Gabriel also plays oboe during the 'Old King Cole' section. Banks and Rutherford both play 12-string acoustic guitars, while Hackett whispers melodic phrases with his Gibson Les Paul electric guitar during the 'Old King Cole' section before playing the lead electric guitar for the rest of the song. During his brief tenure with the band, Mick Barnard added guitar parts towards the end of the song while in rehearsals, which the band liked. Hackett kept both the guitar parts from Phillips and Barnard, while adding his own pieces to the song as well.

Live 
Starting with a performance in Dublin, Ireland on 28 September 1972, Peter Gabriel wore a fox head and his wife's red dress while performing the last verse, resembling a character on the cover of their album "Foxtrot".  The fox costume would be replaced sometime in later 1973 by a mask resembling an old man, as Gabriel would portray the character of Henry, emerging from The Musical Box and apprehending Cynthia. "The Musical Box" was featured in their live repertoire right up to Phil Collins' departure after the We Can't Dance tour in 1992, albeit with only the closing section being included as part of a medley. Between 1972 and 1975, on stage, Tony Banks plays 12 string acoustic guitar during the 'Old King Cole' section, in duet with Rutherford who plays an electric archtop 12 string Rickenbacker guitar that he will keep until the end of the song. Hackett is playing electric guitar during the entire song. There is no bass guitar part in the entire piece.

The song was played live during the Trespass, Nursery Cryme, Foxtrot, Selling England by the Pound, The Lamb Lies Down on Broadway, Wind & Wuthering, Genesis (1984 dates only), and We Can't Dance (as a medley) tours.

Legacy 

A Genesis tribute band, The Musical Box, is named after the song.

Brian May, guitarist with Queen, told Steve Hackett that he was influenced by the harmony guitar solo at the end of the song.

Personnel 
 Peter Gabriel – lead vocals, flute, percussion, oboe
 Tony Banks – Hammond organ, Hohner Pianet electric piano, 12 string guitar, backing vocals
 Steve Hackett – electric guitar, 12 string guitar
 Mike Rutherford – 12 string guitar, Dewtron "Mister Bassman" bass pedal synthesizer
 Phil Collins – drums, backing vocals

References 

1971 songs
Genesis (band) songs
Songs written by Tony Banks (musician)
Songs written by Phil Collins
Songs written by Peter Gabriel
Songs written by Mike Rutherford
Songs about death
Songs about music
Songs written by Anthony Phillips
Songs written by Steve Hackett
British hard rock songs